Ospedaletti is a comune (municipality) in the Province of Imperia in the Italian region of Liguria, located about  southwest of Genoa and about  southwest of Imperia.

Ospedaletti borders the following municipalities: Bordighera, Sanremo, Seborga, and Vallebona.

History 
Ospedaletti is named after a 14th-century hospital which was established by the Knights of Saint John of Jerusalem.

Geography

Located between Caponero and Cape Sant'Ampelio, just six kilometers from Sanremo, it gets some north winds. The lush, sub-tropical vegetation, combined with a moderate and refined urbanization, makes Ospedaletti the pearl of the Riviera dei Fiori (Coast of Flowers). The climate is usually mild.

Twin towns — sister cities
Ospedaletti is twinned with:

  Soulac-sur-Mer, France (1972)

References

External links
 Official website 

Cities and towns in Liguria
Populated coastal places in Italy